Aldo Puccinelli (25 December 1920 – 11 March 1994) was an Italian association football player and manager. He holds the record of league appearances with Lazio (339).

References

1920 births
1994 deaths
Italian footballers
Serie A players
Serie B players
S.S. Lazio players
U.S. Livorno 1915 players
Italian football managers
U.S. Livorno 1915 managers
U.S. Massese 1919 players
U.S. Città di Pontedera players
Association football forwards